Lyndon Evelyn (c. 1759 – 30 April 1839) was a Tory Member of Parliament (MP) in the British Parliament.

He represented the Scottish constituency of Wigtown Burghs 1809–1812, Dundalk in Ireland 1813-1818 and St Ives in Cornwall 1820–1826.

References

External links 

 

1759 births
1839 deaths
Members of the Parliament of the United Kingdom for Scottish constituencies
Members of the Parliament of the United Kingdom for St Ives
Members of the Parliament of the United Kingdom for County Louth constituencies (1801–1922)
Tory MPs (pre-1834)
UK MPs 1807–1812
UK MPs 1812–1818
UK MPs 1820–1826